Roundabout is an open world indie racing video game developed and published by American indie studio No Goblin LLC. It was released for Windows, Mac and Linux on September 18, 2014, for Xbox One on February 20, 2015, and for PlayStation 4 on May 26, 2015. A PlayStation Vita port was released on June 26, 2018, as a cross-buy title with the PlayStation 4 version.

The game involves a constantly-rotating limousine which the player has to drive around an open world while completing miscellaneous objectives such as picking up and dropping people off or finding collectible items. The gameplay has been described as inspired by Kuru Kuru Kururin (where the player also controls a constantly-rotating vehicle), and Crazy Taxi (where the goal of the game is to drive Non-player characters from one location to another).

Gameplay

The player drives a constantly revolving limousine, and must deliver passengers (introduced through full motion video cutscenes) to their intended destinations while avoiding obstacles.

Plot

In 1977, Georgio Manos becomes the world's first revolving limousine driver, taxiing the citizens of the city of Roundabout to various destinations. A frequent passenger named Elizabeth earns Georgio's deep admiration, and a romance begins to develop between the two. Georgio also develops a rivalry with Ronaldo, another limousine driver who steals Georgio's technique and overtakes her as the #1 revolving limousine driver in the city. Desperate to defeat Ronaldo, Georgio acquires some candy dots with the help of Mickey the mechanic, which causes Georgio to hallucinate and see Jeffrey the Skeleton. Guided by Jeffrey in a candy-dot-fueled frenzy, Georgio goes on a murderous rampage through the city. Spurred on by Elizabeth, Georgio then challenges Ronaldo to a race, during which she runs Ronaldo off the road, destroying his car and killing him.

Six months later, Georgio has retreated to the northern mountains out of shame, as destroying someone else's car is akin to treason in Roundabout. Having lost Elizabeth and running low on candy dots, Jeffrey urges Georgio to get their act back together and win back Elizabeth's heart. At the same time, Georgio is hounded by Ge-Op (Georgio Operations), a police squad tasked with hunting her down. In the end, Georgio and Elizabeth are reunited, and Elizabeth explains that she is tired of Georgio's constant spinning, pleading with Georgio to drive straight for even a little while. After Georgio awkwardly attempts to drive straight, Elizabeth decides that she should not force Georgio to be someone she is not, and the two drive off into the sunset together.

Reception

The game received mixed reviews upon release.

References

External links

2014 video games
Indie video games
Full motion video based games
Linux games
Open-world video games
MacOS games
PlayStation 4 games
PlayStation Vita games
Racing video games
Single-player video games
Steam Greenlight games
Video games about taxis
Video games developed in the United States
Video games set in 1977
Xbox One games
Video games featuring female protagonists
LGBT-related video games